The Avispas Negras, also known formally as the Mobile Brigade of Special Troops (BMTE) is a special forces unit in the Cuban Revolutionary Armed Forces. It is often identified as Military Unit 4895.

History 
They were officially created in December 1986. There were earlier special mission units that acted as part of the Ministry of the Interior, many of which served in Angola. The Landing and Assault Brigade was founded on 22 December 1974. It was in 1977, when MINFAR decided to have its own special forces, after depending on the MININT in the Battle of Quifangondo in 1975. On 22 November 2019, the First Secretary of the Communist Party of Cuba, Army General Raúl Castro, imposed the Antonio Maceo Order on the BMTE on the occasion of the 45th anniversary of its foundation. The military unit was also awarded a diploma signed by General Leopoldo Cintra Frías.

Personnel 
The Black Wasps work in sub-groups made up of 5 members, who can be men or women. Its main bases are in the old military prison "El Pitirre", located at kilometer 8 of the National Highway, and in the "Playa Baracoa" unit, near the El Mariel port area. Smaller units operate in "El Bosque de la Habana",  where the Directorate of Special Troops of MINFAR and the El Reloj Club are located, the latter near the Rancho Boyeros airport. At their graduation, the soldiers and professional officers of this force carry out exercises in the Ciénaga de Zapata or in the swamps south of the Isla de la Juventud (formerly Isla de Pinos), huge wetlands located both west of Cuba, in strict survival conditions. Passing these exercises means graduating. The "Black Wasps" have received training from officers of the Vietnamese, North Korean, Chinese special forces, as well as the Russian Airborne Forces and Spetsnaz. The official uniform consists of a camouflage suit, with a red beret, which from 2011, became a green beret, leaving the red beret only for the Prevention Troops (Military Police). The unit symbol is the shield with a black wasp on the front.

Equipment 
The armament is very varied and to a large extent is the same as that used by the rest of the Revolutionary Armed Forces of Cuba (FAR), although in recent years they have been seen in military parades with new weapons that include nationally manufactured weapons and old Soviet weaponry modernized with accessories such as Vilma optical sights and silencers.

Its weapons include the following:

AKMS (nationally manufactured with polymer cylinder head and guard instead of wood and bakelite loader)
AKMSB (as indicated by the letter "B", this version is the same as the AKMS, but it has a silencer and the Cuban-made red-dot sight "Vilma")
AKML
AKS-74U
AS Val 
MP5
AMD-65: Hungarian assault rifle based on the AK-47, with folding stock and used by paratroopers.
SVD Dragunov
VSS Vintorez
PKM machine gun
RPK: light machine gun.
Mambí: 14.5mm anti-material rifle, designed and manufactured in Cuba and with a bullpup design.
Alejandro: bolt action sniper rifle used by troops of the territorial militia (MTT), snipers and wasps.
RPG-7V: anti-tank rocket launcher.
RGD-5: anti-personnel hand grenade.
RKG-3: anti-tank hand grenade.
9K38 Igla: portable anti-aircraft launcher.
PM Makarov: Russian-designed handgun, manufactured under license in Cuba.
Stechkin APS: semi-automatic pistol also used as submachine gun with a 20-rounds magazine.
 Makarov pistol: 9x18mm, version with silencer of the Stechkin APS.
CZ 75, 9mm semi-automatic pistol.

In addition to western armament, other weapons of national manufacture are used, of which details and secondary equipment such as 60mm, 120mm mortars and demolition charges are not known.

The "Black Wasps" have a series of different types of vehicles to make this force as mobile as possible in the event of an attack on the island, among which are a Fiero, an UAZ and a BRDM-2.

See also 
 Russian Special Operations Forces
 United States Navy SEALs

References 

Azerbaijan
Military units and formations of Cuba
Military units and formations established in 1974
Cuba
.01
.01